Steve Davy is a British bass guitarist and vocalist, known for being a member of the blues-rock band Steamhammer. He played on the first three Steamhammer albums. Subsequently he left the band and was replaced by Louis Cennamo.

On  the Steamhammer (also known as Reflection) and Mk II albums of 1969, Davy played bass guitar and sang backing vocals. On the 1970 Mountains album he also played organ.

In 2005 and 2008 he was credited with photography for the Language and Dooji Wooji albums by Lorraine Feather.

References

Year of birth missing (living people)
Living people
English rock bass guitarists
Male bass guitarists
Blues bass guitarists
Blues rock musicians
English blues guitarists
English male guitarists
English rock singers
English blues singers
Steamhammer (band) members